Danila Mikhailovich Semerikov (born 19 October 1994) is a Russian speed skater who specializes in the medium and long distances.

Career
At the 2018 European Speed Skating Championships he won the silver medal in the team pursuit with compatriots Sergey Gryaztsov and Aleksandr Rumyantsev.

At the first competition weekend of the 2018–19 ISU Speed Skating World Cup he won the team pursuit event with Rumyantsev and Sergey Trofimov.

World Cup podiums

Personal records

References

External links

1994 births
Russian male speed skaters
Living people
Sportspeople from Saratov
World Single Distances Speed Skating Championships medalists